Renato Dionisi (2 January 1910 in Rovinj – 24 August 2000 in Verona) was an Italian composer and music educator.

Biography
Renato Dionisi was born in Rovinj in Istria, but soon moved to Borgo Sacco, Rovereto where he spend childhood and early youth. He studied music composition at the music schools in Bolzano and Rovereto, graduating in 1936. From 1940 he taught music history, choral music, harmony and counterpoint at several schools including the Bolzano Conservatory, Milan Conservatory and the Conservatory "Luigi Cherubini" in Florence.

Selected works
  Dionisi's scores are largely published by Casa Ricordi, Edizioni Suvini Zerboni, Edizioni Musicali G. Zanibon and Edizioni Bèrben.
Orchestral
 Aldebaran for flute, oboe, trumpet, harp, string orchestra and percussion (1981)
 Luctus in ludis for narrator and chamber orchestra (1971)
 Sonatina per orchestra e pianoforte a quattro mani (1982)

Concertante
 Tre movimenti (3 Movements) for viola and string orchestra (1966)
 Concerto for 2 pianos and string orchestra (1968)
 Musica for timpani and chamber orchestra

Chamber music
 Quartetto a fiati (Wind Quartet) for flute, oboe, clarinet and bassoon (1958)
 Divertimento per sei strumenti (Divertimento for Six Instruments) for flute, oboe, clarinet, horn, bassoon and piano (1966)
 Piccole composizioni per strumenti a fiato (Little Compositions for Wind Instruments), 19 Small Pieces for flute, oboe, clarinet, bassoon in various combinations (1970)
 Melismi for guitar and 4 instruments (flute, clarinet, viola, cello) (1971)
 Dialogo for trumpet and organ (1972)
 Tredici piccole composizioni (13 Little Compositions) for violin and piano (1973)
 Fantasia for 2 trumpets, 2 trombones and organ (1976)
 Piccole composizioni (Little Compositions), 9 Pieces (set 1) for 2 cellos (1980)
 Piccole composizioni (Little Compositions), 9 Pieces (set 2) for cello and piano (1980)
 Sonatina for viola and piano (1983)
 Due pezzi (2 Pieces) for clarinet solo

Organ
 Tre contrappunti (1966)

Piano	
 15 piccole composizioni per pianisti piccoli (15 Little Compositions for Little Pianists) (1959)
 Movimenti (1966)
 Suoni e risonanze (1971)

Vocal
 Due canti sacri'' for voice, clarinet and piano (1968)

References

External links
 Coro della S.A.T.: Renato Dionisi biographical profile with photograph
 Milano Musica: Renato Dionisi 

1910 births
2000 deaths
Italian male composers
Academic staff of Milan Conservatory
20th-century Italian composers
20th-century Italian male musicians